The Achatocarpaceae are a family of woody flowering plants consisting of two genera and 11 known species, and has been recognized by most taxonomists. The family is found from the southwestern United States south to tropical and subtropical South America.

The APG II system (2003; unchanged from the APG system of 1998) assigns it to the order Caryophyllales in the clade core eudicots. It forms a clade together with Amaranthaceae and Caryophyllaceae, two very large families.

Genera
There are two genera, both of which are dioecious:
 Achatocarpus Triana
 Phaulothamnus A.Gray

References

External links
 
 
 links at CSDL 

Caryophyllales
Caryophyllales families
Dioecious plants